In military slang, a spider hole is a type of camouflaged one-man foxhole, used for observation.

Etymology 

The term is usually understood to be an allusion to the camouflaged hole constructed by the trapdoor spider.

According to United States Marine Corps historian Major Chuck Melson, the term originated in the American Civil War, when it meant a hastily dug foxhole.

The American columnist William Safire claimed in the December 15, 2003, issue of the New York Times that the term originated in the Vietnam War. According to Safire, one of the characteristics of these holes was that they held a "clay pot large enough to hold a crouching man." If the pot broke, the soldier was exposed to attack from snakes or spiders, hence the name "spider hole".

Design 

A spider hole is typically a shoulder-deep, protective, round hole, often covered by a camouflaged lid, in which a soldier can stand and fire a weapon. A spider hole differs from a typical foxhole in that a foxhole is usually deeper and designed to emphasize cover rather than concealment.

Use 

Spider holes were used during World War II by Japanese forces on many Pacific battlefields, including Leyte in the Philippines and Iwo Jima. They called them  for a fancied resemblance to the pots used to catch octopuses in Japan.

Spider holes were also used by fighters of the Viet Cong and soldiers of the People's Army of Vietnam during the Vietnam War as both defensive and offensive fortifications, where VC/PAVN fighters could either seek shelter from combat with ARVN, US or other allied forces, or could conceal themselves in preparation for a surprise attack.

On December 13, 2003, during the Iraq War, American forces in Operation Red Dawn captured Iraqi president Saddam Hussein hiding in what was characterized as a "spider hole" outside an Ad-Dawr farmhouse (near his hometown of Tikrit).

References 

Land warfare